Antaeotricha schlaegeri, the Schlaeger's fruitworm moth, is a species of moth of the family Oecophoridae. It is found in north-eastern North America, south to North Carolina and west to Kansas and Texas.

The wingspan is 21–30 mm. Adults resemble a bird-dropping.

The larvae feed on Quercus alba and related species. They have also been recorded on Betula species.

References

Moths described in 1854
schlaegeri
Moths of North America